Valmondois is a commune in the Val-d'Oise department in Île-de-France in northern France. Valmondois station has rail connections to Persan, Creil, Pontoise and Paris.

Local attractions
Musée des tramways à vapeur et des chemins de fer secondaires français
 Musée de la Meunerie

Notable residents
 The artist Honoré Daumier lived here between 1865 until his death in 1879.

See also
Communes of the Val-d'Oise department

References

External links
 

Association of Mayors of the Val d'Oise 

Communes of Val-d'Oise